"Look at Me" is the first studio single by British synthpop band Mirrors. The single was released in the UK on 10 August 2009 as a one sided 7" on red vinyl and as a digital download. It is said that the 7" was limited to just 200 copies.

The song was re-recorded in June 2010 for inclusion on their debut album Lights and Offerings.
"Look at Me" was covered by Laura Cantrell in December 2009 and was included on Mirrors' first EP Broken by Silence, just as the Pure Groove version of "Look at Me".

The promotional CD-single contains an edit of the song with a trimmed intro.

Track listing

Re-release

The song was re-released on 6 June 2011 on the Skint Records label to promote the "Lights and Offerings" album. This re-issue contains a new remix and "Perfectly Still" which was previously a bonus track on the German "Lights and Offerings" CD and UK vinyl album.

Track listing

Personnel
 James New
 Ally Young
 James Arguile
 Josef Page

References

External links
 Official Website
 Skint Records
 Official German Portal

2009 singles
2011 singles
2009 songs